The White-class buoy tender is a class of buoy tenders of the United States Coast Guard. Eight ships of the  lighter were transferred from the United States Navy and were in commission from 1947 until 2002.

Design 
According to her Ship's Characteristics Card dated August 30, 1965, the White-class buoy tenders were 132 feet 10 inches in overall length; 132 feet in length between perpendiculars; 30 feet 9.75 inches in extreme beam; 15 feet 8 inches in depth of hold; 6 feet 2 inches in draft forward fully loaded; and 5 feet in draft forward with a light load. Their one mast was 48 feet tall. The vessel displaced 600 tons and had a maximum speed of  fully loaded. Their hulls, superstructure, decks, bulkheads, and frames were constructed of steel.  Auxiliary boats in 1965 included a fiberglass outboard and three seven-man inflatable lifeboats.  In 1965, they had original diesel engines built by Union Diesel Engine Company, Oakland, California, with two propellers,  each, and two auxiliary diesel generators.

They underwent a major renovation at the United States Coast Guard Yard in Curtis Bay, Baltimore, Maryland during the 1960s and 70s. These modifications included updated equipment to improve her AtoN capabilities. Before decommissioning, White Pines length was 133 feet; beam, 31 feet; and draft, 8 feet. Her displacement tonnage was listed at 606 gross tons and her mast height as 37.5 feet. She had a lifting capacity of 20,000 pounds, using two hydraulic pumps. She had twin Caterpillar diesel engines, 375 horsepower each, twin propellers, and Detroit Diesel auxiliary generators. Cruising capacity was 10 knots. Her maximum time out to sea was twenty days at 8 knots. Her complement of officers and crew was 26.

Ships in the class

References 

 This article contains public domain text from the United States Coast Guard Historian’s Office website.
http://www.uscg.mil/history/WEBCUTTERS/NPS_133_HAER_Report.pdf
 Cutter History File.  USCG Historian's Office, USCG HQ, Washington, D.C.
 Robert Scheina.  U.S. Coast Guard Cutters & Craft, 1946–1990.  Annapolis, MD: Naval Institute Press, 1990.
 U. S. Department of the Interior.  National Park Service. U.S. Coast Guard  Buoy Tenders.  HAER booklet.  Washington, DC: National Park Service, February, 2004.  [ HAER no. DC-57; Todd Croteau, HAER Industrial Archeologist (project leader); Jet Low, HAER Photographer; Mark Porter, NCSHPO Consultant (historian), and Candace Clifford, booklet design. ]

 
Ships of the United States Coast Guard
Auxiliary tender classes
Ships transferred from the United States Navy to the United States Coast Guard